Michael Cameron Anderson (born July 17, 1987), known professionally as Anderson East, is an American musician from Athens, Alabama, who currently is based in Nashville, Tennessee. East's sound is notable for combining R&B, soul, and roots rock. His song "Satisfy Me" was released in March 2015 and received consistent radio airplay. His major-label record debut, Delilah, was released on the Low Country Sound, an imprint of the Elektra label, in July 2015.

Early life 
East went to Athens High School in Athens, Alabama. East wrote his first song, called "Brains", which he played at his 7th grade talent show. Inspired by the musician Ben Folds, East taught himself piano and started writing music in high school.

His grandfather was a Baptist preacher, his father sang in the church choir, and his mother played the piano in church when he was young.

East attended college in Murfreesboro, Tennessee, at Middle Tennessee State University, studying to become a music engineer. After completing his studies, he later moved to Nashville.

Career 
In the beginning stage of his career, East opened for Holly Williams and ended up playing guitar and singing harmonies with her. At the same time, he worked as a session musician as well as a recording engineer to provide a way to make ends meet.

East began his musical career in 2009, self-releasing an album titled Closing Credits for a Fire under the name Mike Anderson. He then began recording under the name Anderson East with the release of an EP titled Fire Demos.

East's self-released debut album, Flowers of the Broken Hearted in 2012, was made up of two records: one record which he recorded in Los Angeles with producer Chris Seefried and session players Charlie Gillingham, Don Heffington and Rob Wasserman, and a second recorded in Nashville with Tim Brennan and Daniel Scobey. The record is 15 songs long, and is made up of two CDs each with their own music genre: The White disc is made up of a progressive soul and Americana vibe, while the Red disc is darker and has more of a rock sound. He funded the record as a PledgeMusic project, with a percentage of the proceeds going to Water Aid, a nonprofit organization that brings water to communities that do not have clean drinking water.

East's major label debut album, Delilah, was released by Low Country Sound, an imprint of Elektra in July 2015. It was produced by Dave Cobb (Jason Isbell, Sturgill Simpson, Chris Stapleton) and features a song by George Jackson recorded at the legendary FAME Studios in Muscle Shoals, Alabama.

In 2017, East appeared on the Fifty Shades Darker soundtrack album, performing the track "What Would It Take" which he co-wrote with Aaron Raitere. The soundtrack debuted at number one on the Billboard 200. East also covered Brandi Carlile's song "Josephine" to be included for her charity album Cover Stories.

On August 15, 2017, East released the first single from his upcoming album Encore, "All On My Mind", which he subsequently performed on October 13, 2017 in an appearance on The Ellen DeGeneres Show.

Personal life 
East lives in Nashville, Tennessee. On December 28, 2015, Us Weekly and People confirmed that East was dating country singer Miranda Lambert. He co-wrote two songs ("Getaway Driver" and "Well-Rested") with Lambert for her 2016 album, The Weight of These Wings, and he provides background vocals on another song of hers called ("Pushin' Time"). They have since broken up.

Discography

Studio albums

Extended plays
 2010: Fire Demos
 2011: Transitive Property

Singles

Other charted songs

Music videos

Awards and nominations

References

External links 

 

1988 births
American rhythm and blues singer-songwriters
Living people
People from Athens, Alabama
Elektra Records artists
21st-century American singers
21st-century American male singers
American male singer-songwriters
Singer-songwriters from Alabama